Eastern Polytechnic is the first private polytechnic in Rivers State, Nigeria. It was established in 2008 and has its main campus in Rumuokwurusi, Port Harcourt. From the start, the institution has consistently relied on the ideals of innovation, entrepreneurship and commitment, to equip its students with the skills and
knowledge to succeed in a wide range of careers. The current rector is Rev. Fr. Malachy Aguzuru C.S.Sp, who was ordained to the priesthood on 9 July 2005.

The establishment of Eastern Polytechnic was approved by the Federal Ministry of Education (FME). The institution is also accredited by the National Board for Technical Education.

Courses
Eastern Polytechnic offers national
diploma and higher national
diploma courses at undergraduate levels. The general duration for the ND programme is two years. As of February 2016, courses accredited by the NBTE include:

 Accountancy
 Computer science
 Public administration
 Mass communication 
 Computer engineering and Technology
 Business administration and management
 Electrical/Electronic engineering

Governing Council
The institution has a governing council comprising a chairman and members appointed by the proprietor to serve for a period of two years. They may be renominated or reappointed but may not serve more than two terms.

References

External links

Universities and colleges in Port Harcourt
Educational institutions established in 2008
2008 establishments in Nigeria
2000s establishments in Rivers State
Polytechnics in Nigeria
Obio-Akpor